

67001–67100 

|-id=070
| 67070 Rinaldi ||  || Alvaro Rinaldi (born 1926) has been a topographer at the Military Geographic Institute of Florence for 40 years. He is fond of astronomy and sundials. He erected the sundials at the Pistoia Mountains Astronomical Observatory at San Marcello. || 
|-id=085
| 67085 Oppenheimer ||  || J. Robert Oppenheimer (1904–1967) was an American theoretical physicist and the scientific director of the Manhattan Project. From 1947 to 1966 he directed the Institute of Advanced Study at Princeton. also known as the "father of the atomic bomb" || 
|}

67101–67200 

|-bgcolor=#f2f2f2
| colspan=4 align=center | 
|}

67201–67300 

|-id=235
| 67235 Fairbank ||  || William M. Fairbank (1917–1989), an American physicist and professor emeritus at Stanford University, earned his Ph.D. from Yale in 1948. He taught at Amherst College and Duke University before joining the Stanford faculty in 1959. His research interests included superconductivity, gravity waves, individual quarks and monopoles. || 
|}

67301–67400 

|-id=308
| 67308 Öveges || 2000 HD ||  (1895–1979) was a Hungarian teacher of physics who made physics popular to millions of people through his radio and television programs in Hungary. His lectures were unforgettable. || 
|}

67401–67500 

|-bgcolor=#f2f2f2
| colspan=4 align=center | 
|}

67501–67600 

|-bgcolor=#f2f2f2
| colspan=4 align=center | 
|}

67601–67700 

|-bgcolor=#f2f2f2
| colspan=4 align=center | 
|}

67701–67800 

|-id=712
| 67712 Kimotsuki || 2000 UG || Kimotsuki, a Japanese town, where JAXA's Uchinoura Space Center is located. Since 1962, approximately 400 rockets and 27 satellites, including Japan's first satellite "Ohsumi" and the asteroid probe "Hayabusa", have been launched from the center. || 
|}

67801–67900 

|-id=853
| 67853 Iwamura ||  || Akinori Iwamura (born 1979), born in Ehime prefecture, was a baseball player for the Tokyo Yakult Swallows from 1998 to 2006. He got the Gold Gloves Award five times as the best defensive third baseman. Beginning in 2007, Iwamura will play in U.S. Major League baseball for the Tampa Bay Devil Rays. || 
|}

67901–68000 

|-id=979
| 67979 Michelory ||  || Michel Ory (born 1966), a Swiss physicist and teacher in the Jura Mountains, founded the Observatoire Astronomique Jurassien , near Vicques. The discoverer of minor planets has discovered 30 minor planets, including a Hilda object between 2000 and 2003. || 
|}

References 

067001-068000